Mazarlaq (also Romanized as Mazārlaq; also known as Eslāmbūl) is a village in Jargalan Rural District, Raz and Jargalan District, Bojnord County, North Khorasan Province, Iran. At the 2006 census, its population was 1,037, in 226 families.

References 

Populated places in Bojnord County